POLDER (POLarization and Directionality of the Earth's Reflectances) is a passive optical imaging radiometer and polarimeter instrument developed by the French space agency CNES.

Description 
The device was designed to observe solar radiation reflected by Earth's atmosphere, including studies of tropospheric aerosols, sea surface reflectance, bidirectional reflectance distribution function of land surfaces, and the Earth Radiation Budget.

Specifications 

Imaging 
POLDER utilizes a push broom scanner. The device's optical system uses a telecentric lens and a charged coupled device matrix with a resolution of 242x548 pixels. The field of view ranges from ±43° to ±57°, depending on the tracking method.

Spectral characteristics 
The device scans between 443 and 910 nm FWHM, depending on the objective of the measurement.  The shorter wavelengths (443–565 nm) typically measure ocean color, whereas the longer wavelengths (670–910 nm) are used to study vegetation and water vapor content.

Data transfer 
It transmits data on 465.9875 MHz at bit rate of 200 bit/s, and receives on 401.65 MHz at 400 bit/s. The data rate is 880 kbit/s at a quantization level of 12 bits.

Missions 
POLDER was first launched as a passenger instrument aboard ADEOS I on 17 August 1996. The mission ended on 30 June 1997 when communication from the host satellite failed. POLDER 2 was launched in December 2002 aboard ADEOS II.  The second mission ended prematurely after 10 months when the satellite's solar panel malfunctioned.
A third generation instrument was launched on board the French PARASOL microsatellite. The satellite was maneuvered out of the A-train on 2 December 2009 and permanently shut down on 18 December 2013.

Footnotes

Sources

External links 
 POLDER website

Radiometry
Earth observation satellite sensors